Rodrigo Pedrosa Rêgo (born 26 March 2002) is a Portuguese professional footballer who plays as a defender for Eerste Divisie club FC Eindhoven.

Club career
Rêgo is a youth academy graduate of Sporting CP. On 31 August 2021, he joined Varzim on a season long loan deal. He made his professional debut for the club on 7 November 2021 in a 2–2 draw against Porto B. He scored his team's opening goal in 65th minute of the match and got sent off 15 minutes later.

On 11 July 2022, Rêgo signed a two-year contract with Dutch Eerste Divisie club Eindhoven.

International career
Rêgo is a Portuguese youth international. He was part of squad which reached quarter-finals of 2019 UEFA European Under-17 Championship.

Career statistics

Club

References

External links
 
 

2002 births
Living people
Association football defenders
Portuguese footballers
Portuguese expatriate footballers
Portugal youth international footballers
Liga Portugal 2 players
Eerste Divisie players
Varzim S.C. players
FC Eindhoven players
Sportspeople from Almada
Expatriate footballers in the Netherlands
Portuguese expatriate sportspeople in the Netherlands